The 2015–16 Los Angeles Clippers season was the 46th season of the franchise in the National Basketball Association (NBA), their 38th season in Southern California, and their 32nd season in Los Angeles.

On July 8, despite offers from the Dallas Mavericks, DeAndre Jordan returned to the Clippers with a 4-year, $87.7 million deal.

During the offseason the Clippers signed veteran and Boston Celtics legend Paul Pierce and he played the rest of his career as a Clipper. The signing reunited Pierce with his former coach Doc Rivers, who coached the Celtics from 2004-2013 and won them a championship in 2008.

The Clippers played most of the season without Blake Griffin, who broke his hand in a fight and was subsequently suspended for 4 games. He returned on April 3 after sitting out 45 games.

The Clippers entered the playoffs against the 5th-seeded 44–38 Portland Trail Blazers who were 9 games behind them. However, injuries robbed the team and that was their undoing as they were eliminated in the first round in six games by the Trail Blazers for the first time since 2013, when the team was eliminated by the Memphis Grizzlies.

Draft

The Clippers did not have a pick in the 2015 NBA Draft.

Roster

Roster notes
 Forward Wesley Johnson becomes the 25th former Laker to play for the crosstown rival Clippers.

Preseason

|- style="background:#bfb;"
| 1
| October 2
| Denver
| 103–96
| DeAndre Jordan (15)
| DeAndre Jordan (11)
| Chris Paul (9)
| Staples Center14,245
| 1–0
|- style="background:#fbb;"
| 2
| October 4
| @ Toronto
| 73–93
| JJ Redick (15)
| DeAndre Jordan (10)
| Chris Paul (8)
| Rogers Arena19,000
| 1–1
|- style="background:#fbb;"
| 3
| October 11
| @ Charlotte
| 94–106
| JJ Redick (23)
| Blake Griffin (9)
| Blake Griffin (10)
| Shenzhen Universiade Sports Centre17,376
| 1–2
|- style="background:#fbb;"
| 4
| October 14
| Charlotte
| 71–113
| Chris Paul (17)
| Blake Griffin (14)
| Chris Paul (6)
| Mercedes-Benz Arena15,905
| 1–3
|- style="background:#bfb;"
| 5
| October 20
| Golden State
| 130–95
| Blake Griffin (29)
| DeAndre Jordan (10)
| Chris Paul (10)
| Staples Center15,889
| 2–3
|- style="background:#bfb;"
| 6
| October 22
| Portland
| 115–109
| Blake Griffin (22)
| DeAndre Jordan (13)
| Chris Paul (8)
| Staples Center13,969
| 3–3

Standing

By Division

By Conference

Regular season game log

|- style="background:#bfb;"
| 1
| October 287pm
| @ Sacramento
| 
| Blake Griffin (33)
| DeAndre Jordan (12)
| Chris Paul (11)
| Sleep Train Arena17,458
| 1–0
|-style="background:#bfb;"
| 2
| October 297:30 pm
| Dallas
| 
| Blake Griffin (26)
| DeAndre Jordan (14)
| Chris Paul (5)
|Staples Center19,218
| 2–0
|-style="background:#bfb;"
| 3
| October 317:30 pm
| Sacramento
| 
| Blake Griffin (37)
| DeAndre Jordan (18)
| Chris Paul (11)
| Staples Center19,060
| 3–0

|- style="background:#bfb;"
| 4
| November 27:30 pm
| Phoenix
| 
| Blake Griffin (22)
| Blake Griffin (10)
| Chris Paul (5)
| Staples Center19,060
| 4–0
|- style="background:#fbb;"
| 5
| November 47:30 pm
| @ Golden State
| 
| Chris Paul (24)
| DeAndre Jordan (13)
| Chris Paul (9)
| Oracle Arena19,596
| 4–1
|- style="background:#fbb;"
| 6
| November 77:30 pm
| Houston
| 
| Blake Griffin (35)
| DeAndre Jordan (14)
| Griffin, Pierce (5)
| Staples Center19,361
| 4–2
|- style="background:#bfb;"
| 7
| November 97:30 pm
| Memphis
| 
| Blake Griffin (24)
| Griffin, Jordan (12)
| Chris Paul (4)
| Staples Center19,060
| 5–2
|- style="background:#fbb;"
| 8
| November 115pm
| @ Dallas
| 
| Blake Griffin (21)
| DeAndre Jordan (11)
| Chris Paul (11) 
| American Airlines Center19,805
| 5–3
|- style="background:#fbb;"
| 9
| November 127:30 pm
| @ Phoenix
| 
| Jamal Crawford (18)
| DeAndre Jordan (9)
| Blake Griffin (4)
| Talking Stick Resort Arena17,204
| 5–4
|- style="background:#bfb;"
| 10
| November 1412:30 pm
| Detroit
| 
| Jamal Crawford (37)
| DeAndre Jordan (16)
| Blake Griffin (9)
| Staples Center19,060
| 6–4
|- style="background:#fbb;"
| 11
| November 197:30 pm
| Golden State
| 
| Chris Paul (35)
| DeAndre Jordan (8)
| Chris Paul (8)
| Staples Center19,528
| 6–5
|- style="background:#fbb;"
| 12
| November 207pm
| @ Portland
| 
| Blake Griffin (21)
| DeAndre Jordan (15)
| Chris Paul (8)
| Moda Center19,393
| 6–6
|- style="background:#fbb;"
| 13
| November 2212:30 pm
| Toronto
| 
| JJ Redick (17)
| DeAndre Jordan (14)
| Chris Paul (11)
| Staples Center19,060
| 6–7
|- style="background:#bfb;"
| 14
| November 246pm
| @ Denver
| 
| Jordan, Griffin (18)
| DeAndre Jordan (11)
| Chris Paul (10)
| Pepsi Center13,257
| 7–7
|- style="background:#fbb;"
| 15
| November 257:30 pm
| Utah
| 
| Blake Griffin (40)
| Blake Griffin (12)
| Chris Paul (8)
| Staples Center19,060
| 7–8
|- style="background:#bfb;"
| 16
| November 277:30 pm
| New Orleans
| 
| Griffin, Paul (20)
| DeAndre Jordan (11)
| Chris Paul (8)
| Staples Center19,162
| 8–8
|- style="background:#bfb;"
| 17
| November 2912:30 pm
| Minnesota
| 
| Blake Griffin (26)
| DeAndre Jordan (9)
| Chris Paul (9)
| Staples Center19,060
| 9–8
|- style="background:#bfb;"
| 18
| November 307:30 pm
| Portland
| 
| Blake Griffin (23)
| DeAndre Jordan (24)
| Griffin, Paul (6) 
| Staples Center19,060
| 10–8

|- style="background:#fbb;"
| 19
| December 27:30 pm
| Indiana
| 
| Griffin, Stephenson (19)
| DeAndre Jordan (15)
| Blake Griffin (6)
| Staples Center19,060
| 10–9
|- style="background:#bfb;"
| 20
| December 57:30 pm
| Orlando
| 
| Jamal Crawford (32)
| DeAndre Jordan (14)
| Blake Griffin (7)
| Staples Center19,146
| 11–9
|- style="background:#bfb;"
| 21
| December 75pm
| @ Minnesota
| 
| DeAndre Jordan (20)
| DeAndre Jordan (12)
| Jamal Crawford (7)
| Target Center11,467
| 12–9
|- style="background:#bfb;"
| 22
| December 95pm
| @ Milwaukee
| 
| JJ Redick (31)
| DeAndre Jordan (21)
| Chris Paul (18)
| BMO Harris Bradley Center14,224
| 13–9
|- style="background:#fbb;"
| 23
| December 105pm
| @ Chicago
| 
| Blake Griffin (18)
| DeAndre Jordan (14)
| Chris Paul (5)
| United Center21,491
| 13–10
|- style="background:#bfb;"
| 24
| December 122pm
| @ Brooklyn
| 
| Griffin, Redick (21)
| DeAndre Jordan (12)
| Chris Paul (14)
| Barclays Center15,689
| 14–10
|- style="background:#bfb;"
| 25
| December 144:30 pm
| @ Detroit
| 
| Blake Griffin (34)
| DeAndre Jordan (14)
| Chris Paul (12)
| The Palace of Auburn Hills13,525
| 15–10
|- style="background:#bfb;"
| 26
| December 167:30 pm
| Milwaukee
| 
| Chris Paul (21)
| Griffin, Jordan (8)
| Chris Paul (8)
| Staples Center19,060
| 16–10
|- style="background:#fbb;"
| 27
| December 185pm
| @ San Antonio
| 
| Chris Paul (27)
| DeAndre Jordan (17)
| Chris Paul (10)
| AT&T Center18,418
| 16–11
|- style="background:#fbb;"
| 28
| December 195pm
| @ Houston
| 
| Blake Griffin (22)
| DeAndre Jordan (11)
| Chris Paul (10) 
| Toyota Center18,212
| 16–12
|- style="background:#fbb;"
| 29
| December 217:30 pm
| Oklahoma City
| 
| Chris Paul (32)
| DeAndre Jordan (10)
| Chris Paul (10)
| Staples Center19,415
| 16–13
|- style="background:#bfb;"
| 30
| December 257:30 pm
| @ L.A. Lakers
| 
| Chris Paul (23)
| DeAndre Jordan (14)
| Chris Paul (6)
| Staples Center18,997
| 17–13
|- style="background:#bfb;"
| 31
| December 266pm
| @ Utah
| 
| JJ Redick (25)
| DeAndre Jordan (13)
| Chris Paul (11) 
| Vivint Smart Home Arena19,911
| 18–13
|- style="background:#bfb;"
| 32
| December 284pm
| @ Washington
| 
| Chris Paul (23)
| DeAndre Jordan (13)
| Chris Paul (7) 
| Verizon Center20,356
| 19–13
|- style="background:#bfb;"
| 33
| December 304pm
| @ Charlotte
| 
| JJ Redick (26)
| DeAndre Jordan (13)
| Chris Paul (11)  
| Time Warner Cable Arena19,145
| 20–13
|- style="background:#bfb;"
| 34
| December 315pm
| @ New Orleans
| 
| JJ Redick (26)
| DeAndre Jordan (20)
| Chris Paul (12) 
| Smoothie King Center16,920
| 21–13

|- style="background:#bfb;"
| 35
| January 27:30 pm
| Philadelphia
| 
| DeAndre Jordan (22)
| DeAndre Jordan (13)
| Chris Paul (14)
| Staples Center19,212
| 22–13
|- style="background:#bfb;"
| 36
| January 67pm
| @ Portland
| 
| Chris Paul (21)
| DeAndre Jordan (14)
| Chris Paul (19)
| Moda Center18,598
| 23–13
|- style="background:#bfb;"
| 37
| January 912:30 pm
| Charlotte
| 
| Chris Paul (25)
| DeAndre Jordan (19)
| Chris Paul (7)
| Staples Center19,060
| 24–13
|- style="background:#bfb;"
| 38
| January 1012:30 pm
| New Orleans
| 
| Chris Paul (25)
| DeAndre Jordan (11)
| Chris Paul (11)
| Staples Center19,060
| 25–13
|- style="background:#bfb;"
| 39
| January 137:30 pm
| Miami
| 
| Cole Aldrich (19)
| Paul Pierce (9)
| Chris Paul (12)
| Staples Center19,194
| 26–13
|- style="background:#fbb;"
| 40
| January 167:30 pm
| Sacramento
| 
| JJ Redick (22)
| Cole Aldrich (10)
| Chris Paul (7)
| Staples Center19,191
| 26–14
|- style="background:#bfb;"
| 41
| January 187:30 pm
| Houston
| 
| JJ Redick (40)
| DeAndre Jordan (15)
| Chris Paul (12)
| Staples Center19,060
| 27–14
|- style="background:#fbb;"
| 42
| January 215pm
| @ Cleveland
| 
| Chris Paul (30)
| DeAndre Jordan (13)
| Chris Paul (9)
| Quicken Loans Arena20,562
| 27–15
|- style="background:#bfb;"
| 43
| January 224:30 pm
| @ New York
| 
| DeAndre Jordan (20)
| DeAndre Jordan (8)
| Chris Paul (13)
| Madison Square Garden19,812
| 28–15
|- style="background:#fbb;"
| 44
| January 243pm
| @ Toronto
| 
| Chris Paul (23)
| DeAndre Jordan (11)
| Chris Paul (13)
| Air Canada Centre19,800
| 28–16
|- style="background:#bfb;"
| 45
| January 264pm
| @ Indiana
| 
| Chris Paul (26)
| DeAndre Jordan (19)
| Chris Paul (7)
| Bankers Life Fieldhouse15,448
| 29–16
|- style="background:#bfb;"
| 46
| January 275pm
| @ Atlanta
| 
| Jamal Crawford (21)
| DeAndre Jordan (19)
| Chris Paul (10) 
| Philips Arena17,664
| 30–16
|- style="background:#bfb;"
| 47
| January 297:30 pm
| L.A. Lakers
| 
| Chris Paul (27)
| DeAndre Jordan (17)
| Chris Paul (7)
| Staples Center19,495
| 31–16
|- style="background:#bfb;"
| 48
| January 3112:30 pm
| Chicago
| 
| Jamal Crawford (26)
| DeAndre Jordan (20)
| Chris Paul (7)
| Staples Center19,325
| 32–16
|-

|- style="background:#fbb;"
| 49
| February 37:30 pm
| Minnesota
| 
| Chris Paul (22)
| DeAndre Jordan (15)
| Chris Paul (8)
| Staples Center19,060
| 32–17
|- style="background:#bfb;"
| 50
| February 54pm
| @ Orlando
| 
| Chris Paul (21)
| DeAndre Jordan (18)
| Chris Paul (6)
| Amway Center16,647
| 33–17
|- style="background:#bfb;"
| 51
| February 711am
| @ Miami
| 
| Chris Paul (22)
| Aldrich, Jordan (11)
| Chris Paul (7)
| American Airlines Arena19,624
| 34–17
|- style="background:#bfb;"
| 52
| February 84pm
| @ Philadelphia
| 
| Crawford, Redick (23)
| DeAndre Jordan (21)
| Chris Paul (7)
| Wells Fargo Center13,310
| 35–17
|- style="background:#fbb;"
| 53
| February 104:30 pm
| @ Boston
| 
| Chris Paul (35)
| DeAndre Jordan (16)
| Chris Paul (13) 
| TD Garden18,186
| 35–18
|- align="center"
|colspan="9" bgcolor="#bbcaff"|All-Star Break
|- style="background:#bfb;"
| 54
| February 187:30 pm
| San Antonio
| 
| Chris Paul (28)
| DeAndre Jordan (17)
| Chris Paul (12)
| Staples Center19,410
| 36–18
|- style="background:#fbb;"
| 55
| February 205:30 pm
| Golden State
| 
| Chris Paul (24)
| DeAndre Jordan (21)
| Chris Paul (6)
| Staples Center19,585
| 36–19
|- style="background:#bfb;"
| 56
| February 227:30 pm
| Phoenix
| 
| JJ Redick (22)
| DeAndre Jordan (11)
| Chris Paul (14)
| Staples Center19,060
| 37–19
|- style="background:#fbb;"
| 57
| February 247:30 pm
| Denver
| 
| Crawford, Redick (20)
| DeAndre Jordan (12)
| Chris Paul (10) 
| Staples Center19,060
| 37–20
|- style="background:#bfb;"
| 58
| February 267pm
| @ Sacramento
| 
| Chris Paul (40)
| DeAndre Jordan (11)
| Chris Paul (13)
| Sleep Train Arena17,317
| 38–20
|- style="background:#bfb;"
| 59
| February 297:30 pm
| Brooklyn
| 
| Jamal Crawford (26)
| DeAndre Jordan (10)
| Chris Paul (12) 
| Staples Center19,060
| 39–20
|-

|- style="background:#bfb;"
| 60
| March 27:30 pm
| Oklahoma City
| 
| Chris Paul (21)
| DeAndre Jordan (18)
| Chris Paul (13)
| Staples Center19,304
| 40–20
|- style="background:#fbb;"
| 61
| March 57:30 pm
| Atlanta
| 
| Jordan, Paul (17)
| DeAndre Jordan (11)
| Chris Paul (11)
| Staples Center19,236
| 40–21
|- style="background:#bfb;"
| 62
| March 75:30 pm
| @ Dallas
| 
| Chris Paul (27)
| DeAndre Jordan (20)
| Chris Paul (7)
| American Airlines Center20,002
| 41–21
|- style="background:#fbb;"
| 63
| March 96:30 pm
| @ Oklahoma City
| 
| Jeff Green (23)
| DeAndre Jordan (7)
| Chris Paul (16)
| Chesapeake Energy Arena18,203
| 41–22
|- style="background:#bfb;"
| 64
| March 117:30 pm
| New York
| 
| Chris Paul (24)
| DeAndre Jordan (19)
| Chris Paul (15)
| Staples Center19,175
| 42–22
|- style="background:#fbb;"
| 65
| March 1312:30 pm
| Cleveland
| 
| JJ Redick (19)
| DeAndre Jordan (11)
| Chris Paul (10)
| Staples Center19,342
| 42–23
|- style="background:#fbb;"
| 66
| March 155:30 pm
| @ San Antonio
| 
| Chris Paul (22)
| DeAndre Jordan (14)
| Chris Paul (8)
| AT&T Center18,418
| 42–24
|- style="background:#bfb;"
| 67
| March 166:30 pm
| @ Houston
| 
| JJ Redick (25)
| DeAndre Jordan (16)
| Chris Paul (16)
| Toyota Center18,304
| 43–24
|- style="background:#fbb;"
| 68
| March 195pm
| @ Memphis
| 
| Chris Paul (25)
| DeAndre Jordan (7)
| Chris Paul (6)
| FedExForum18,119
| 43–25
|- style="background:#fbb;"
| 69
| March 203pm
| @ New Orleans
| 
| Paul, Redick (21)
| DeAndre Jordan (9)
| Chris Paul (13)
| Smoothie King Center17,407
| 43–26
|- style="background:#fbb;"
| 70
| March 237:30 pm
| @ Golden State
| 
| DeAndre Jordan (19)
| DeAndre Jordan (20)
| Chris Paul (8)
| Oracle Arena19,596
| 43–27
|- style="background:#bfb;"
| 71
| March 247:30 pm
| Portland
| 
| Crawford, Paul (25)
| DeAndre Jordan (13)
| Chris Paul (5)
| Staples Center19,359
| 44–27
|- style="background:#bfb;"
| 72
| March 2712:30 pm
| Denver
| 
| DeAndre Jordan (16)
| DeAndre Jordan (16)
| Chris Paul (9)
| Staples Center19,060
| 45–27
|- style="background:#bfb;"
| 73
| March 287:30 pm
| Boston
| 
| Austin Rivers (16)
| DeAndre Jordan (13)
| Chris Paul (14)
| Staples Center19,258
| 46–27
|- style="background:#bfb;"
| 74
| March 305pm
| @ Minnesota
| 
| Chris Paul (20)
| Chris Paul (8)
| Chris Paul (16)
| Target Center12,252
| 47–27
|- style="background:#fbb;"
| 75
| March 316:30 pm
| @ Oklahoma City
| 
| Jamal Crawford (32)
| Cole Aldrich (10)
| Jamal Crawford (7)
| Chesapeake Energy Arena18,203
| 47–28
|-

|- style="background:#bfb;"
| 76
| April 312:30 pm
| Washington
| 
| Chris Paul (27)
| DeAndre Jordan (12)
| Chris Paul (12)
| Staples Center19,060
| 48–28
|- style="background:#bfb;"
| 77
| April 57:30 pm
| L.A. Lakers
| 
| Chris Paul (25)
| DeAndre Jordan (14)
| Chris Paul (8)
| Staples Center19,537
| 49–28
|- style="background:#bfb;"
| 78
| April 67:30 pm
| @ L.A. Lakers
| 
| JJ Redick (15)
| DeAndre Jordan (11)
| Chris Paul (8)
| Staples Center18,997
| 50–28
|- style="background:#bfb;"
| 79
| April 86pm
| @ Utah
| 
| Cole Aldrich (21)
| Cole Aldrich (18)
| Pablo Prigioni (7)
| Vivint Smart Home Arena19,911
| 51–28
|- style="background:#bfb;"
| 80
| April 1012:30 pm
| Dallas
| 
| Jamal Crawford (22)
| Blake Griffin (11)
| Chris Paul (11)
| Staples Center19,170
| 52–28
|- style="background:#bfb;"
| 81
| April 127:30 pm
| Memphis
| 
| Austin Rivers (14)
| DeAndre Jordan (12)
| Chris Paul (13)
| Staples Center19,147
| 53–28
|- style="background:#fbb;"
| 82
| April 137:30 pm
| @ Phoenix
| 
| Wesley Johnson (19)
| Cole Aldrich (10)
| Pablo Prigioni (9)
| Talking Stick Resort Arena18,055
| 53–29

Playoffs

Game log

|- style="background:#bfb;"
| 1
| April 17
| Portland
| 
| Chris Paul (28)
| Griffin, Jordan (12)
| Chris Paul (11)
| STAPLES Center19,122
| 1–0
|- style="background:#bfb;"
| 2
| April 20
| Portland
| 
| Chris Paul (25)
| DeAndre Jordan (18)
| Jordan, Paul (5)
| STAPLES Center19,127
| 2–0
|- style="background:#fbb;"
| 3
| April 23
| @ Portland
| 
| Chris Paul (26)
| DeAndre Jordan (16)
| Chris Paul (9)
| Moda Center19,761
| 2–1
|- style="background:#fbb;"
| 4
| April 25
| @ Portland
| 
| Green, Griffin (17)
| DeAndre Jordan (15)
| Chris Paul (4)
| Moda Center19,607
| 2–2
|- style="background:#fbb;"
| 5
| April 27
| Portland
| 
| JJ Redick (19)
| DeAndre Jordan (17)
| Crawford, Prigioni (4)
| STAPLES Center19,060
| 2–3
|- style="background:#fbb;"
| 6
| April 29
| @ Portland
| 
| Jamal Crawford (32)
| DeAndre Jordan (20)
| Austin Rivers (8)
| Moda Center19,768
| 2–4

Transactions

Trades

Free agents

Re-signed

Additions

Subtractions

References

Los Angeles Clippers seasons
Los Angeles Clippers
Los Angeles Clippers
Los Angeles Clippers